Anything to Say? is an itinerant bronze sculpture and art installation by Italian artist Davide Dormino that was erected on May 1st, 2015, on Berlin's Alexanderplatz. The whistleblowers Edward Snowden, Julian Assange, and Chelsea Manning are shown standing on three chairs in the installation, which also contains an empty fourth chair that will serve as a platform for public speaking. People are encouraged to "stand up instead of sit like the others" by the fourth empty chair.
The installation was unveiled as part of a private art project supported by international crowdfunding. In 2016 Davide Dormino was awarded the Prix Éthique 2016 by Anticor for Anything to Say?

Message
"A lot of people say they are traitors, but I want to celebrate these living heroes," Davide Dormino says. "My work is a monument to the future."
Davide Dormino's sculpture, Anything to say?", symbolizes the courage of whistleblowers and all those who fight to defend freedom of expression and information throughout the world. It travels from city to city to remind the public about the massive invasions of privacy, the information control and the disinformation to which they are subjected by governments and corporations, and about their democratic and legitimate right to know.
Julian Assange, Chelsea Manning and Edward Snowden were chosen as examples of contemporary heroes who have put themselves in danger in order to reveal information and shed light on events that were hidden or misrepresented. Like them, countless citizens all over the world put their freedom, courage and integrity in the service of truth.
The sculpture is supported by Reporters Without Borders (RSF), an NGO that defends media freedom.

Berlin – Alexanderplatz
On May 1, 2015 on the historical Alexanderplatz, in Berlin, the sculpture (930 kilos) was unveiled by Patrick Bradatsch with artist Davide Dormino, the speakers, the journalists and those who joined the event. Many people surrounded the sculpture, in turn stepping up on the chair to speak, or just to show their support. The speakers at the event who stood up on the chair armed with megaphones were: Davide Dormino, sculptor, Michel Rediske for Reporters without Frontiers, Hans Christian Ströbele from the German Green Party, Sarah Harrison for Wikileaks-Courage Foundation, Annie Machon, ex former MI5 intelligence officer, Anjhula Mya Singh Bais actress and human rights activist. The sculpture does not endorse any specific political ideals or religious beliefs, nor does it belong to any specific country. Courage is for all. The project was born from the enthusiasm of a group of ordinary people who believe that courage is contagious.

Dresden – Theaterplatz 
The sculpture has been exhibited at Dresden on June 1 in the Theaterplatz for the International week to support Whistleblowing celebrated all over the world from June 1 to 7, 2015.

After Dresden, the sculpture has been exhibited to Ostrale 015, till September 2015. Ostrale 2015 is a famous art event whose aim is to stimulate the dialogue among several artistic disciplines and different artistic fields for those artists who are interested in networking and connecting with people who do not necessarily belong to the art system.

Geneva – Place des Nations
The sculpture stopped in Geneva during the 30th session of the Human Rights Council, on the Place des Nations from September 14 to 18, just in front of the United Nations building. The support Committee for the event in Geneva is composed of the NGO Press Emblem Campaign (PEC), of the International Centre for Peace and Human Rights (CIPADH), of Blaise Lempen, Pilar Ackermann, Fabio Lo Verso, Charly Pache and of the representative of a group of citizens that contributed to the realisation of the project, Marco Benagli.

Paris – Georges Pompidou Centre
The Georges Pompidou Centre in Paris displayed the sculpture from September 23 to 29 in the square in front of the centre, where the display was inaugurated on September 23 in the presence of Dormino, Reporters Without Borders secretary-general Christophe Deloire, UBS whistleblower Stéphanie Gibaud, Luc Hermann, an investigative journalist who is one of the directors of the Premières Lignes production company, and Marco Benagli, representing a civil society group that helped fund the project.

The French actress Catherine Deneuve also attended as the inauguration's sponsor. She sat in the sculpture's empty chair and read an address written for the occasion by Irène Frachon, the French specialist who exposed the dangers of the antidiabetic drug Mediator.

Strasbourg – Place Kléber
The sculpture was displayed in Strasbourg’s Place Kléber from November 16 to 21 as part of the annual Strasbourg World Forum for Democracy. The display was inaugurated on November 17 in the presence of Dormino, Deloire and Luxleaks whistleblower Antoine Deltour.

Tours
The sculpture has been installed in front of the Gare de Tours during the 9th edition of the Assises du Journalisme, from March 9 to 11, 2016.

Perugia – Piazza IV Novembre
The sculpture Anything to Say?  has been exhibited for the first time in Italy, in the historical square Piazza IV Novembre in Perugia, during the 10th International Journalism Festival (April 6–10, 2016).

An associated panel discussion entitled From WikiLeaks to Snowden: protecting high-value sources in the age of mass surveillance on Friday April 8 with speakers Sarah Harrison, Davide Dormino, John Goetz and Stefania Maurizi.

On April 6 during the 7th anniversary of the earthquake in L'Aquila,

Vincenzo Vittorini, the spokesman of a delegation struggling for truth and justice for the earthquake 309 victimes, stood up one the sculpture's empty chair to make a speech about the responsibility of the Italian Government in L'Aquila tragic events.

Belgrade 
Promoted and supported by The Italian Institute of Culture in Serbia, with the collaboration of G12@HUB and the Radisson Artist Residency Program, Anything to say? has been exhibited at the contemporary art Dev9t Festival, from June 8 to 10, 2016.

Ptuj- Mestni trg Square 
The sculpture has been exhibited in the Slovenian city during the 14th edition of the Art Stays Festival-politic(s) from July 8 until July 16.

Rome – P.le Aldo Moro 
Promoted by MLAC- Museo Laboratorio di Arte Contemporanea and supported by La Sapienza University of Rome. The Sculpture has been exhibited in front of the entrance of the University from December 9 until December 13, 2016. At the opening there was hundred citizen and representatives of non-governmental organisations, universities, and students. Such people will include Gianni Rufini, Director of Amnesty International; Irene Caratelli, Director of the Department of International Relations and Global Politics at the American University of Rome, Professor Claudio Zambianchi, Director of MLAC.

Spoleto – Piazza Campello 

July 6–13, 2019
On Saturday July 6 Anything to say has added a new stop on its route, arriving at Spoleto on the premises of Fuori Festival during the 62nd Edition of Festival dei Due Mondi.
It's been an important stage where the speech, which was started over the past years in support of freedom of speech, has reached a wider extent in defense of all civil rights in our society and of journalism. For the first time, in fact, the event has been expressly dedicated to journalism in support of press freedom and of the sources of journalists' investigations.
The speakers:
Roberto Natale (FNSI)
Lazzaro Pappagallo (Stampa Romana)
 Carlo Picozza (Ordine dei Giornalisti – Lazio)
Alberto Spampinato (Ossigeno per l’Informazione)
Giuseppe Cavalcanti (ANSA)
Matteo Bartocci (Il Manifesto)
Raffaele Angius (giornalista)
Stefania Maurizi (il fatto quotidiano)

Berlin – Brandenburger Tor 

November 27–30, 2019
A sculpture of WikiLeaks co-founder Julian Assange and whistleblowers Edward Snowden and Chelsea Manning, returned to Berlin as Germany's Bundestag held a public hearing on Assange's UK extradition case. The event – organised by German political party Die Linke (The Left) – was also attended by Assange's father John Shipton, Wikileaks Editor-in-Chief  Kristinn Hrafnsson, one of Assange's case lawyers Renata Avila and UN Special Rapporteur on Torture Nils Melzer are taking part in a public hearing The sculpture was created by Italian artist Davide Dormino who was present at the rally.
Speakers:
Sevim Dagdelen, Abgeordnete der Fraktion DIE LINKE
Dietmar Bartsch, MdB, Vorsitzender der Fraktion DIE LINKE im Deutschen Bundestag
Sahra Wagenknecht, MdB
Nils Melzer, UN-Sonderberichterstatter zum Thema Folter
Kristinn Hrafnsson, Chefredakteur Wikileaks
John Shipton, Vater von Julian Assange
Davide Dormino, Künstler

Bruxelles – Place de la Monnaie 

January 29–31, 2020
The International Federation of Journalists (IFJ) has taken part on Wednesday, January 29 to two events of the Belgian civil society, namely Carta Academica and Belgium4Assange, in public actions in Brussels to defend freedom of expression, press freedom and the right to know in general, Julian Assange, Chelsea Manning, Sarah Harrison and Edward Snowden in particular.
Citizens, journalists, artists, human rights organizations and journalists' unions met in Brussels on Wednesday January 29 to call on the Belgian government to do all it can to protect Julian Assange and prevent his extradition to the United States.

Julian Assange, Edward Snowden, Chelsea Manning and Sarah Harrison are the 21st century heroes and fighters. They sacrificed their freedom for information, they sacrificed their lives for the truth," added Anthony Bellanger, standing on the 4th chair of Davide Dormino's sculpture, "Anything to say", Wednesday afternoon at Place de la Monnaie in Brussels, renamed Place Julian-Assange for the occasion.

Lünersee Lake

September, 2020
In September 2020, at the height of the pandemic, the artwork 'Anything To Say' was placed in the Lünersee in the Austrian Alps to film a documentary made by the young video makers of Alive Family.
The Lünersee, once one of the largest natural mountain lakes in the Eastern Alps, is 1,970 m above sea level.

Cologne - Cologne Cathedral 

October 16–18, 2020
Julian Assange's father John Shipton collected the "Cologne Karls Prize for Engaged Literature and Journalism" granted to his son Julian by the NRhZ-Online media in front of Cologne Cathedral on Friday. The life-size itinerant sculpture "Anything to say?" by Italian sculptor Davide Dormino was displayed as part of its global tour celebrating Assange, and whistleblowers Edward Snowden and Chelsea Manning.
"It is now 26 prizes for journalism that Julian has received and this is because the information that he gives, that WikiLeaks give, is vital to the people who hear it. That's us, you and me, and everybody here, and our mothers and fathers and children. The information that Chelsea Manning, Julian Assange and WikiLeaks bring to us is vital for our existence and freedom," Shipton said.

Genève - Bains de Pâquis 

June 5th-August, 2021,
Geneva mobilizes to demand the release of Julian Assange
Julian Assange's partner, Stella Moris, traveled to Geneva to attend the Geneva call to free Assange. A press conference hosted by the Geneva Press Club launched the appeal, followed by a public inauguration of the AnythingToSay? by Italian Artist  Davide Dormino. The statue dedicated to whistleblowers Edward Snowden and Chelsea Manning as well as to Julian Assange will be installed at the same time on the Bain de Pâquis pier in front of the Geneva Jet d’eau.
The initiative’s six demands, included a call on the U.S. administration to drop the charges without delay, while urging the British authorities to resist any extradition attempt.
Among the personalities and speakers present were United Nations Special Rapporteur on Torture Nils Melzer, the mayor of Geneva Frédérique Perler, Geneva Councilor of States Carlo Sommaruga, the secretary general of Reporters Without Borders Christophe Deloire, Member of the Grand Conseil Geneva Jean Rossiaud and the executive director of the Swiss Press Club Pierre Ruetschi.

Udine - Piazza Libertà 

May 8-15, 2022
The Artwork was exhibited in Udine for the 18th edition of Vicino/Lontano Festival.
Meetings, debates, conversations, lectures, readings, exhibitions, shows and screenings occupy the city's historic centre and some of its most striking buildings for four intense days.
Scholars, journalists, writers and artists of international prestige will confront each other and the public to analyse, from different points of view, the processes of the transformation underway in the globalised world, in the economic, social, cultural and geopolitical fields, with the aim of investigating their reasons, mechanisms, meanings and perspectives.
The Assange case was the subject of the in-depth discussion "Secret Power. Why they want to destroy Julian Assange" with the author of the investigative essay Stefania Maurizi and Davide Dormino, moderated by Fabio Chiusi, which took place on 12 May in the Loggia del Lionello.

Leipzig - Augustusplatz 

August 6-10, 2022
On the 6th of August in conjunction with the first international art exhibition for Julian Assange, Leipzig becomes the 19th city to display Davide Dormino ’s iconic tribute – ‘Anything To Say’ – to Edward Snowden, Julian Assange & Chelsea Manning. The statue was unveiled in front of Opera Theater in Augustusplatz.

Melbourne - Queensbridge Square 

March 7-8, 2023
line up of speakers and artists include:
MC: Dr. Josephine Scicluna- PEN Melbourne, Dr. Olivia Ball – Melbourne City Council, Davide Dormino – Sculpture Artist, Chris McKenzie – PEN Melbourne, Stephen Kenny – Australian Lawyer for Julian Assange (Former lawyer for David Hicks), Dean Yates – Former Reuters Bureau Chief in Baghdad at time of Collateral Murder, David McBride – Military Whistle-blower facing 75 years in jail for exposing war crimes in Afghanistan, John Shipton – Father and dedicated Campaigner of freedom for his son Julian Assange.

Sydney - St Andrews Cathedral 

March 10-11, 2023
line up of speakers:
Legendary Journalist, writer and director John Pilger, Mary Kostakidis, Dean Yates, Lissa Johnson, David McBride, Stephen Kenny, John Shipton and Davide Dormino.

See also
 Crypto-anarchism
 Freedom of information
 Internet privacy

References

External links
 Official website

Cultural depictions of Edward Snowden
Cultural depictions of Julian Assange
Cultural depictions of activists
Statues of activists